Indreni Khojdai Jada is a 2013 Nepali drama film, directed and written by Sahara Sharma in her debut. The film is produced by Abhimanyu Dixit under the banner of Gaythali Entertainment. The film stars Kritika Lamsal, Deepak Ghimire, Sanam Pyakurel, Sahayog Adhikary, and Dipendra K.C. The film generally received mixed feedback from the critics. The film premiered at the 11th edition of Kathmandu International Mountain Film Festival.

Plot 
Three siblings move to Kathmandu to follow their dreams.

Cast 

 Kritika Lamsal
 Deepak Ghimire
 Sanam Pyakurel
 Sahayog Adhikary
 Dipendra K.C.

Release and reception 
In 2013, Indreni Khojdai Jada premiered at the 11th edition of Kathmandu International Mountain Film Festival. At the festival it won Best Fiction Film.

The staff of Nepali Times wrote, "After numerous short movies, Indreni Khojdai Jada marks the wonderful silver screen debut of the talented filmmaker Sahara Sharma who has donned the hat of writer, director, and cinematographer for this particular movie. Our wait for a good storyteller has finally come to a dreamy end".

References

 2013 films
Nepalese drama films
Films set in Kathmandu